The 33rd government of Turkey (26 March 1971 – 11 December 1971) was a government in the history of Turkey. It is also called the first Erim government.

Background 
After the memorandum of the army on 12 March 1971, prime minister Süleyman Demirel of the Justice Party (AP) resigned, and a new government was founded by Nihat Erim, who had recently resigned from the Republican People's Party (CHP). However, his appointment caused unrest in CHP and Bülent Ecevit resigned from his post as the general secretary of his party to protest the appointment. Nevertheless, İsmet İnönü, the leader of the party, supported Nihat Erim and Erim formed a semi-technocratic government with the support of CHP, AP, and the National Reliance Party (MGP).

The government
In the list below, the serving period of cabinet members who served only a part of the cabinet's lifespan are shown in the column "Notes".

Aftermath
Some of the technocrats in the cabinet (like Atilla Karaosmanoğlu) resigned, and Nihat Erim decided to form a new government.

Trivia
Türkan Akyol, the Minister of Health, was the very first Turkish female cabinet minister in the history of Turkey.

References

Cabinets of Turkey
1971 establishments in Turkey
1971 disestablishments in Turkey
Cabinets established in 1971
Cabinets disestablished in 1971
Coalition governments of Turkey
Members of the 33rd government of Turkey
14th parliament of Turkey